Emilio Sánchez won the men's singles tennis title at the 1991 Italian Open after Alberto Mancini retired from the final, with the scoreline at 6–3, 6–1, 3–0.

Thomas Muster was the defending champion, but lost to Goran Prpić in the third round.

Seeds

Draw

Finals

Section 1

Section 2

Section 3

Section 4

References

External links
Main Draw

Men's Singles